The Glasgow Tigers are an American Football club based in Glasgow, Scotland, who compete in the BAFA National Leagues NFC 1 Scotland, the second level of British American Football. They operate from Nethercraigs (Corkerhill) and were formed in 1986 as the Strathclyde Sheriffs but opted to rebrand in 2002. They were the 1988 Champions of the now defunct Scottish Caledonian Bowl in which they defeated the Ness Monsters.

History
The Glasgow Tigers, originally known as the Strathclyde Sheriffs, trace their origins back to 1985 when 50 prospective players put £50 each into a kitty to form the club. The Sheriffs were run by officers from the Strathclyde Police Force and entered their first regular season in 1986 where they managed an 8–2 season, just missing out on the playoffs. 

In 1988 the Sheriffs went undefeated and won the Caledonian Bowl with a 46–12 victory against the Ness Monsters. 

Reached the semi-finals of the BNGL Premier Division in 1991 and were then disqualified after a player registration scandal. They then missed the following two seasons, before starting again in 1993.

In 1994 they entered the Scottish Gridiron Association and for four consecutive seasons between 1995 and 1998 played all other teams across Scotland. 

In 2002 the team rebranded as the Glasgow Tigers. To this day, original Sheriffs players play an integral role in coaching and management of the team and the team maintains a strong link with the local police force. 

The team has made seven playoff appearances in total – three as the Sheriffs (1988, 1990, 1996) and four as the Tigers (2002, 2004, 2009, 2016). The Tigers won their division in 2009 and were one game away from making an appearance in a bowl game. 

Following the conclusion of the 2016 season, the Tigers were promoted to the BAFA NFC 1 North for the first time.

Records as Strathclyde Sheriffs 
Honours: CAFL champions 1988. Conference champions 1992

2001 BSL Division Two Northern Conference, 2-6-0
2000 BSL Division Two Northern Conference, 1-7-0
1999 BSL Division Two Northern Conference, 0-8-0
1998 SGA, 1-4-0
1997 SGA, 1-7-0
1996 SGA, record unknown*
1995 SGA, Division Two 3-6-0
1994 BAFA, Division Two Scottish Conference 4-6-0
1993 BNGL Premier Division Scottish Conference, 2-8-0
1992 did not compete
1991 did not compete
1990 BNGL Premier Division Scottish Conference, 8-0-0* 
1989 CGL Duke Premier Division Scottish Conference, 1-9-0
1988 CAFL, 10-0-0
1987 Budweiser League Premier Division Borders Conference, 1-5-2
1986 BAFL Anglo Conference Scottish Division, 8-2-0

External links 
Glasgow Tigers Official Site
Glasgow Tigers Twitter
Glasgow Tigers Facebook

American football teams in Scotland
BAFA National League teams
Sports teams in Glasgow
1986 establishments in Scotland
American football teams established in 1986